Charles Compton Cavendish, 1st Baron Chesham (28 August 1793 – 12 November 1863) was a British Liberal politician.

Early life
Cavendish was the fourth son of George Augustus Henry Cavendish, 1st Earl of Burlington, third son of the former Prime Minister William Cavendish, 4th Duke of Devonshire, and his wife Lady Charlotte Elizabeth Boyle, daughter of the architect Richard Boyle, 3rd Earl of Burlington and 4th Earl of Cork. His mother was Lady Elizabeth Compton, daughter of Charles Compton, 7th Earl of Northampton.

Career
In 1814, at the age of 21, Cavendish was elected Member of Parliament for Aylesbury, a seat he held until 1818, and later sat for Newtown from 1821 to 1830, for Yarmouth (Isle of Wight) from 1831 to 1832, for East Sussex from 1832 to 1841, for Youghal from 1841 to 1847 and for Buckinghamshire from 1847 to 1857. In 1858, he was raised to the peerage as Baron Chesham, of Chesham in the County of Buckingham.

Personal life
Lord Chesham married Lady Catherine Susan Gordon, daughter of George Gordon, 9th Marquess of Huntly, in 1814. Together, they were the parents of three children:

 William George Cavendish, 2nd Baron Chesham
 Hon. Susan Sophia Cavendish, who married Thomas Trevor, 22nd Baron Dacre
 Hon. Harriet Elizabeth Cavendish, who married, as his second wife, George Byng, 2nd Earl of Strafford.

He died in November 1863, aged 70. He was succeeded in the barony by his son William.

See also
Duke of Devonshire
Earl of Burlington

Notes

References 
 Kidd, Charles, Williamson, David (editors). Debrett's Peerage and Baronetage (1990 edition). New York: St Martin's Press, 1990,

External links 
 

1793 births
1863 deaths
Charles Cavendish, 1st Baron Chesham
Cavendish, Charles
Cavendish, Charles
Cavendish, Charles
Cavendish, Charles
Cavendish, Charles
Cavendish, Charles
Cavendish, Charles
Cavendish, Charles
Cavendish, Charles
Cavendish, Charles
UK MPs who were granted peerages
Cavendish, Charles
Cavendish, Charles
1
Cavendish, Charles
Place of birth missing
Place of death missing
Peers of the United Kingdom created by Queen Victoria